The Central Bank of Honduras was established on 1 July 1950.
The current bank president is Wilfredo Cerrato.

Presidents
Roberto Ramírez Ordóñez, 1950-1971
Alberto Galeano, 1971-1975
Guillermo Bueso, 1975-1981
Práxedes Martínez Silva, 1981-1982
Gonzalo Carías, 1982-1989
Ricardo Maduro, 1990-1994
Hugo Noé Pino, 1994-1997
Emin Barjum, 1998
Victoria Asfura de Díaz, 1999-2002
Maria Elena Mondragón, 2002-2006
Gabriela Núñez, 2006-2007
Edwin Araque Bonilla, 2008
Sandra Midence, 2009-2010
Maria Elena Mondragón, 2010-2014
Marlon Tábora Muñoz, 2014-2015
Manuel de Jesús Bautista, 2016-2018
Wilfredo Cerrato, 2018-

References

External links
  Official site of Banco Central de Honduras

Honduras
Economy of Honduras
Banks of Honduras
1950 establishments in Honduras
Banks established in 1950